Richard Greaves may refer to:

Richard L. Greaves (1938–2004), American historian
Richard Methuen Greaves (1852–1942), Welsh landowner